Julie, ou Le pot de fleurs is a 1805 comic opera in one act by Gaspare Spontini to a libretto by the metallurgist Antoine-Gabriel Jars (1774–1857).

Cast
Julie, Mondor's niece (soprano)
Mondor (bass)
Verseuil, Mondor's friend (baritone)
Valcour, a young officer (tenor)
Champagne, servant (speaking role)

Performances and recordings
1968 – in Italian – Valeria Mariconda (Julie), Ugo Trama (Mondor), Giancarlo Montanaro (Verseuil), Amilcare Blaffard (Valcour), Siena Festival. Bruno Rigacci
2001 – in French – Caroline Mutel (Julie), Olivier Heyte (Verseuil), Till Fechner (Mondor), Martial Defontaine (Valcour) – Festival Pergolesi-Spontini, Villa Pianetti, Monsano, conducted by Ottavio Dantone.

References

Operas by Gaspare Spontini
French-language operas
Opéras comiques
1805 operas
Operas